Community Music is a 2000 studio album by Asian Dub Foundation. It peaked at number 20 on the UK Albums Chart. It features vocal contributions from Benjamin Zephaniah, Ambalavaner Sivanandan, Nusrat Fateh Ali Khan, and Assata Shakur.

Critical reception

Chris Grimshaw of AllMusic commented that "Community Music should be in every thinking person's collection, directly between the Clash and Public Enemy." Nick Mirov of Pitchfork wrote, "Community Music is incredibly ambitious, and amazingly, it delivers everything it promises and then some."

NME listed it as the 39th best album of 2000.

Track listing

Personnel
Credits adapted from liner notes.

Asian Dub Foundation
 Deedar – vocals, programming
 Chandrasonic – vocals, guitar, programming
 Dr. Das – vocals, bass guitar, programming
 Pandit G – vocals, sampler, turntables
 Sun-J – synthesizer, effects

Additional musicians
 Jim Hunt – saxophone (1, 4)
 Nichol Thomson – trombone (1, 4)
 Duncan Mackay – trumpet (1, 4)
 Paul Chivers – percussion (3)
 Catalisa – vocals (4, 11)
 Johnny Kalsi – percussion (4, 7, 10)
 Benjamin Zephaniah – vocals (5)
 Helen MacDonald – vocals (6)
 Louis Beckett – keyboards (6)
 Ambalavaner Sivanandan – vocals (8)
 Sangeeta Sharma – vocals (8)
 Nusrat Fateh Ali Khan – vocals (9)
 Louis Beckett – guitar (10)
 Assata Shakur – vocals (13)

Charts

References

External links
 

2000 albums
Asian Dub Foundation albums
FFRR Records albums
London Records albums